Braimoh or Braimah is a Ghanaian and Nigerian name that may refer to
Given name
Braimah Kamoko (born 1980), Ghanaian professional boxer 

Surname
Alhassan Braimah, Ghanaian politician and author 
Maria Braimoh (born 1990), Nigerian badminton player
Suleiman Braimoh (born 1989), Nigerian-American basketball player in the Israel Basketball Premier League
Tanko Braimah (born 1979), Ghanaian sprinter 
Yisa Braimoh (born 1942), Nigerian politician